The black drum (Pogonias cromis), also known as the drum or drummer, is a saltwater fish similar to its cousin, the red drum. It is in the genus Pogonias. Though most specimens are generally found in the 5-30 lb (2–14 kg) range, the black drum is well known as the largest of all the drum family with some specimens reaching excesses of 90 lb (40 kg).  The world record black drum was just over 113 lb (51 kg). They are often black and/or gray in color with juvenile fish having distinctive dark stripes over a gray body. Their teeth are rounded and they have powerful jaws capable of crushing oysters and other shellfish. It is recommended those over 15 lb (7 kg) should be released. Black drum are capable of producing tones between 100 Hz and 500 Hz when performing mating calls.

Habits, distribution, and characteristics
The black drum is usually found in or near brackish waters. Larger, older fish are more commonly found in the saltier areas of an estuary (closer to the ocean) near oyster beds or other plentiful food sources. Juvenile fish have four to five bold vertical black bars on a light background and can be mistaken for sheepshead at first glance, but are distinguished on closer inspection because sheepshead have teeth and black drum have chin barbels. Juvenile fish are more commonly found in less salty areas and relate more strongly to structure and cover. In the western Atlantic, black drum are found from Nova Scotia to Florida, the Gulf of Mexico, the Antilles (uncommon), and the southern Caribbean coast; also from the Orinoco delta to Argentina. They are common between the Delaware Bay and Florida coasts, and most abundant along the Texas coast. After reaching maturity by the end of their second year, black drum spawn in and around estuarine waters. In Texas, most spawning takes place in February and March.

Feeding
Black drum larvae eat mostly zooplankton, and young black drum (less than 20 cm long) eat worms and small fish. Black drum are mostly bottom feeders, with adults eating mostly mollusks and crabs. In shallow water, they have been reported to feed with their heads down so that their tails show above the water surface.  Their sensitive chin barbels help locate food, and strong pharyngeal teeth crush the shells of these preferred foods.  It has been reported that, in captivity, large drum were able to eat more than two commercial-sized oysters per kilogram of body weight each day. This translates into the potential for a 20 kg drum (about 45 lb) to eat 40 oysters a day.  Fishing advice for black drum along the east and southeast coasts of the United States often includes the suggestion to locate an oyster bed.  However, this preference has also caused black drum to be a nuisance for those who raise oysters commercially. A group of black drum can do great damage to an oyster bed in a single day.

Growth
 Annual growth rate for ages 1–3 is 100–150 mm/year and then slows to 10–50 mm/year for ages 10–20. Studies have reported black drum weighing more than 60 kg on the Atlantic coast and they are believed to live up to 60 years.  Other studies suggest that black drum in the Gulf of Mexico do not grow as large or live as long; in a sample of 1357 black drum from coastal Louisiana, the largest individual was 22.6 kg and the oldest was 44 years.

The length vs. age graph shows how the typical length of black drum increases with age.  The weight vs. length graph shows how the typical weight of black drum increases with length; small differences during different seasons have been measured as shown. This kind of information can be used to estimate weight based on length.  More scientifically, it can be used to determine whether a given sample of black drum is above or below expected weight, which may be related to a number of environmental conditions.

Fishing

Black drum are bottom feeders, so they are most commonly caught with bait either on the bottom or suspended within a couple feet of the bottom.  Bottom fishing methods are used both in surf fishing and inshore fishing.  Shrimp is a typical bait that works well; squid can also be used and is less subject to bait stealing by hardhead catfish and Atlantic croakers which often frequent the same waters.  There are times when the older, larger fish are more readily caught on a half or a quarter of a blue crab with the top shell removed and cut or broken to fit on a 4/0 to 9/0 hook. This type of fishing is often combined with chumming, a baiting practice that involves scattering bits of fish parts and blood into the water as an attractant. Sometimes black drum are caught on spoons and jigs.

Black drum are reported to mouth a natural bait, so anglers need to wait a few seconds before setting the hook.  Once a big adult drum grabs the bait, it takes off with gusto, and can put up quite a fight.  An unsecured rod can easily be pulled into the water.  Landing these big fish on light tackle can be challenging, and since drum are primarily scent-based feeders, there is little disadvantage in using heavier line and tackle.  A 40-lb braided line with a comparable weight fluorocarbon leader is a good compromise between castability and strength.  However, big drum are frequently caught with everything from 8-lb monofilament to 100-lb braided lines with heavy steel leaders.

An effective strategy for fishing from a boat is to select a spot with a sandy bottom or oyster bed where food is plentiful at a time of day with some tidal movement.  Pier or bank fishing should target jetties, structure, or a boat channel near a rapid increase in depth and some tidal movement.  With stout tackle, black drum above  are relatively easy for children to catch because they are not particularly skittish and do not easily come off once they are hooked.  Because bigger drum can make a long, strong run right after taking the bait, preventing broken line often requires a relatively light drag setting early in the fight.

One researcher reported good success with trotline fishing techniques, which he used to catch a large sample of black drum for tagging and scientific study.

Some states, such as Texas (as of summer 2017), allow spearfishing for black drum which often frequent jetties and other near shore structures.

As food
Black drum are edible, with a moderate flavor and are not oily. Some restaurants in the southern US serve smaller black drum.  Big drum can be challenging to clean; removing the large scales is a challenge.  Many fishermen prefer to fillet with an electric knife, first removing the fillet from along the backbone, and then using the electric knife to cut the fillet from the skin and scales.  Fish over  can become tough and have a consistency comparable with chicken, rather than the flakey texture of many species of fish.  Younger fish are often indistinguishable in flavor from red drum.

Notes

References
 Black Drum, Texas Parks and Wildlife, http://www.tpwd.state.tx.us/huntwild/wild/species/blackdrum/
 Smithsonian Marine Station http://www.sms.si.edu/IRLSpec/Pogoni_cromis.htm

black drum
Commercial fish
Sport fish

Fish of the Eastern United States
Fish of the Western Atlantic
Taxa named by Carl Linnaeus
black drum